The New Caledonian owlet-nightjar (Aegotheles savesi), also known as the enigmatic owlet-nightjar, is a large owlet-nightjar with vermiculated grey-brown and black plumage. It has a long, slightly rounded tail, short, rounded wings, and long, stout legs. Its voice is unknown, but other owlet-nightjar species make churring and whistling sounds. It is the second-largest known owlet-nightjar (only the extinct New Zealand owlet-nightjar was larger), much larger than the Australian owlet-nightjar.

The New Caledonian owlet-nightjar is endemic to New Caledonia’s Melaleuca savanna and humid forests. Other owlet-nightjars are solitary, nest in holes in trees, and forage from a perch, both sallying out to catch flying insects and descending onto prey on the ground or on trunks and branches. It is unknown if these habits apply to the New Caledonian owlet-nightjar, but this species is larger and has longer legs than the others, so it may be more terrestrial.

The type specimen was collected after the bird flew into a bedroom in the village of Tonghoué. This large owlet-nightjar is only known from two specimens taken in 1880 and 1915 and a small handful of sightings. The most recent report is from a 1998 expedition which saw a large nightjar-like bird foraging for insects at dusk in Rivière Ni Valley. That report has been taken to suggest that the species may still survive in small numbers, but that total population is likely smaller than 50 individuals and declining.

References

External links 
BirdLife Species Factsheet
New Caledonia's Most wanted

Aegotheles
Nightjars
Endemic birds of New Caledonia
Critically endangered fauna of Oceania
Birds described in 1881
Taxa named by Edgar Leopold Layard